Canada was the host nation for the 1988 Winter Olympics in Calgary.  It was the first time that Canada had hosted the Winter Olympic Games, and second time overall, after the 1976 Summer Olympics in Montreal. Vancouver would eventually host the 2010 Winter Olympics which makes it the second city in Canada to host the Winter Olympics and the third overall.

Medalists
For the second time Canada failed to obtain a gold medal on home soil. 22 years later, Alexandre Bilodeau was the first Canadian to obtain a gold medal on home soil in the 2010 Winter Olympics, the first of a Winter Olympics record for most gold medals of 14.

Competitors
The following is the list of number of competitors in the Games.

Alpine skiing

A total of 14 competitors, including the entire Canadian team was disqualified from the event after organizers became aware their ski suits were not previously approved by the International Ski Federation.

Men

Men's combined

Women

Women's combined

Biathlon

Men

Men's 4 x 7.5 km relay

 1 A penalty loop of 150 metres had to be skied per missed target.
 2 One minute added per missed target.

Bobsleigh

Cross-country skiing

Men

 C = Classical style, F = Freestyle

Men's 4 × 10 km relay

Women

 C = Classical style, F = Freestyle

Women's 4 × 5 km relay

Figure skating

Men

Women

Pairs

Ice Dancing

Ice hockey

Group A

Canada 1-0 Poland
Canada 4-2 Switzerland
Finland 3-1 Canada
Canada 9-5 France
Canada 2-2 Sweden

Medal round
The top three teams from each group play the top three teams from the other group once. Points from previous games against their own group carry over.

 Soviet Union 5-0 Canada
 Canada 8-1 West Germany
 Canada 6-3 Czechoslovakia

Team Roster
Sean Burke
Andy Moog
Chris Felix
Randy Gregg
Serge Roy
Tony Stiles
Tim Watters
Trent Yawney
Zarley Zalapski
Ken Berry
Marc Habscheid
Vaughn Karpan
Wally Schreiber
Gord Sherven
Claude Vilgrain
Serge Boisvert
Brian Bradley
Bob Joyce
Steve Tambellini
Merlin Malinowski
Jim Peplinski
Ken Yaremchuk
Head coach: Dave King

Luge

Men

(Men's) Doubles

Women

Nordic combined 

Men's individual

Events:
 normal hill ski jumping 
 15 km cross-country skiing

Ski jumping 

Men's team large hill

 1 Four teams members performed two jumps each. The best three were counted.

Speed skating

Men

Women

References

Works cited

Further reading 

 Olympic Winter Games 1988, full results by sports-reference.com

Nations at the 1988 Winter Olympics
1988
Winter Olympics